The Plapcea Mică is a left tributary of the river Plapcea in Romania. It flows into the Plapcea near Mihăilești-Popești.

References

Rivers of Romania
Rivers of Olt County